Obion County Central High School is a public high school in Troy, Tennessee, United States. It is part of the Obion County Schools system. As of 2021–2022, it has an enrollment of approximately 834 students.  The current principal is Barry Kendall.

References

External links
 School website
 Obion County School District
 Greatschools.org profile

Public high schools in Tennessee
Educational institutions established in 1997
1997 establishments in Tennessee
Schools in Obion County, Tennessee